Anasuya Shankar (1 September 1928 – 29 July 1963), popularly known by her pen name as Triveni, was an Indian writer of modern fiction in Kannada language. Many of her novels have been made into feature films, most prominently, Belli Moda (1967) and Sharapanjara (1971) – both directed by Puttanna Kanagal and featuring actress Kalpana. Her short-stories collection Samasyeya Magu won the Devaraja Bahadur Prize in 1950. Her novel Avala Mane earned the Karnataka Sahitya Academy Award in 1960.

Life
Anasuya Shankar was born on 1 September 1928 in the Chamarajapuram suburb of Mysore, in the erstwhile Kingdom of Mysore of British India (in present-day Mysore Karnataka), to B. M. Krishnaswamy and Thangamma. She was also called Bhagirathi. She had a younger sister Aryamba Pattabhi, who went on to become a writer as well. Other writers in her family were uncle B. M. Srikantaiah and cousin Vani.

She graduated with a gold medal in her Bachelor of Arts degree from Maharani's Arts College in Mysore. In 1947, she was awarded the Siddegowda gold medal for excellence on political science. She married S. N. Shankar (1925–2012) in 1951, an English professor at Sarada Vilas College, Mysore.

Anasuya adopted the pen name Triveni out of respect for Mahatma Gandhi, whose ashes following his death, were immersed in the confluence of the three Indian rivers of Ganges, Yamuna and the invisible Sarasvati, known as the Triveni Sangam. Anasuya died of pulmonary embolism on 29 July 1963, ten days after giving birth to Meera, from her third pregnancy after two miscarriages, at the Mission Hospital in Mysore.

Career
Triveni published her first novel Apasvara in 1952. After that, she published 20 novels and 3 short story collections. Her novels mainly contained stories based on the psychological issues faced by women, their emotions and frustrations. Her Tavareya Kola won the Sahitya Akademi Award.

Literary works

Novels 
 Apaswara (Disharmony, 1952)
 Hoovu Hannu (Flower Fruit, 1953)
 Sotu Geddavalu (Lost and win, 1953)
 Bekkina Kannu (Cat's Eye, 1954)
 Modala Hejje (The First Step, 1956)
 Keelu Gombe (The Puppet, 1955)
 Belli Moda
 Doorada Betta (Distant Hill, 1955)
 Apajaya (Defeat, 1956)
 Mucchida Bagilu (Closed Door, 1956)
 Kankana (Sacred Bond, 1957)
 Mukti (Bliss, 1957)
 Baanu Belagitu (The sky shines)
 Hrudaya Geethe
 Avala Mane
 Tavareya Kola
 Vasantagaana
 Kashi Yatre
 Sharapanjara (Cage of Arrows, 1962)
 Hannele Chiguridaga (When the old leaf turns green again, 1963)
 Avala Magalu
 Belli Moda
 Doorada Betta (Distant Hill, 1955)

Collection of short stories 
 Hendatiya Hesaru
 Yeradu Manasu
 Samasyeya Magu

Filmography based on her novels
 Chettathi (1965) Malayalam movie directed by Puttanna Kanagal partially based on Hannele Chiguridaga.
 Poocha Kanni (1966) Malayalam movie directed by Puttanna Kanagal based on Bekkina Kannu.
 Belli Moda (1967)
 Hannele Chiguridaga (1968)
 Sharapanjara (1971)
 Kankana (1975) film based on Kankana & Mukti
 Hoovu Hannu (1993)

External links
 Triveni

References

 
1928 births
1963 deaths
Writers from Mysore
Kannada people
Kannada-language writers
Women writers from Karnataka
Indian women novelists
Indian women short story writers
20th-century Indian novelists
20th-century Indian short story writers
20th-century Indian women writers
Novelists from Karnataka
Pseudonymous women writers
20th-century pseudonymous writers